Mary Patricia Clarke  (born 30 July 1926) is a writer, historian and former journalist who now writes about nineteenth century women in Australia.

Early life and education 
Clarke was born in Alphington, Melbourne to John L. Ryan, a teacher, and Annie T. Ryan (nee McSweeney). She was educated in Melbourne until the family moved to Sale where she went to secondary school and then at the University of Melbourne.

Career 
Clarke worked as a journalist at the Australian News and Information Bureau in Melbourne and Canberra, for the Australian Broadcasting Corporation in the Press Gallery, Parliament House, Canberra, as journalist and editor for Maxwell Newton Publications and as Editor of Publications for the National Capital Development Commission. She has published numerous books about women in Australian history, with a particular interest in female journalists

Clarke is an honorary fellow of the Australian Academy of Humanities, fellow of the Federation of the Australian Historical Societies and awardee of a Medal of the Order of Australia for contributions to literature on Australian history.

Awards 
 1993 Harold White Fellow, National Library of Australia
 1995 Joint winner, Society of Women Writers non-fiction award
 2001 Medal of the Order of Australia (OAM)
 2002 Fellow Federation of Australian Historical Societies
 2005 Honorary Fellow Australian Academy of Humanities
 2016 Friends Medal National Library of Australia
 2016 Petherick Medal National Library of Australia

Bibliography 
 Great Expectations: Emigrant Governesses in Colonial Australia (National Library of Australia Publisher, 2020)
 Eilean Giblin: A feminist between the wars (Monash University Publishing 2013). Short-listed for 2014 Magarey Medal for Biography.
 With Love and Fury: Selected Letters of Judith Wright, ed., with Meredith McKinney (National Library of Australia 2007)
 The Equal Heart and Mind: Letters between Judith Wright and Jack McKinney, ed. with Meredith McKinney (University of Queensland Press, 2004)
 Steps to Federation: Lectures marking the Centenary of Federation, ed.. (Australian Scholarly Publishing, 2001)
 Rosa! Rosa! A Life of Rosa Praed, Novelist and Spiritualist. (Melbourne University Press, 1999)
 Tasma’s Diaries (Mulini Press, 1995)
 Tasma: The Life of Jessie Couvreur, Allen & Unwin, Sydney, 1994. Joint winner Society of Women Writers’ Non-fiction Award.
 Life Lines: Australian Women’s Letters and Diaries 1788–1840 (with Dale Spender). (Allen & Unwin, 1992) 
 Pioneer Writer: The Life of Louisa Atkinson, Novelist, Journalist, Naturalist. (Allen & Unwin,1990.)
 Pen Portraits: Women Writers and Journalists in Nineteenth Century Australia. (Allen & Unwin, 1988; Pandora, London 1988) 
 A Colonial Woman: The Life and Times of Mary Braidwood Mowle 1827–1857. (Allen & Unwin 1986, Eden Killer Whale Museum and Historical Society, 2001, 2003, 2006)
 The Governesses: Letters from the Colonies 1862–1882. (Allen & Unwin 1989)

References 

Australian historians
Australian journalists
Australian women historians
Australian women journalists
1926 births
Living people
People from Alphington, Victoria
University of Melbourne alumni
Recipients of the Medal of the Order of Australia
Fellows of the Australian Academy of the Humanities
Journalists from Melbourne
Writers from Melbourne